There are approximately 372,905 listed historic buildings in England and 2.5% of these are Grade I. This article comprises a list of these buildings in the county of Cornwall.

Cornwall

|}

Isles of Scilly

|}

Notes

See also

Grade II* listed buildings in Cornwall
:Category:Grade I listed buildings in Cornwall

References

External links

 
Cornwall